The Amesbury Archer is an early Bronze Age (Bell Beaker) man whose grave was discovered during excavations at the site of a new housing development in Amesbury near Stonehenge. The grave was uncovered in May 2002. The man was middle aged when he died, estimated between 35-45, and is believed to date from about 2300 BC. He is nicknamed "the Archer" because of the many arrowheads buried with him. The grave contained more artefacts than any other early British Bronze Age burial, including the earliest known gold objects ever found in England. It was the first evidence of a very high status and wealth expressed in a burial from that time. Previously Bronze Age society had been assumed not to have been particularly hierarchical.

The calibrated radiocarbon dates for his grave and dating of Stonehenge suggest the sarsens and trilithons at Stonehenge may have been raised by the time he was born, although a new bluestone circle may have been raised at the same time as his birth.

Burial
The Archer's grave yielded the greatest number of artefacts ever found in a British burial from the Early Bronze Age. Among those discovered were: five funerary pots of the type associated with the Beaker culture; three tiny copper knives; sixteen barbed flint arrowheads; a kit of flint-knapping and metalworking tools, including cushion stones that functioned as a kind of portable anvil, which suggests he was a coppersmith; and some boar tusks. A piece of iron pyrites, which sparks when struck by flint to start a fire, had been well used with grooves worn along its sides. On his forearm was a black stone wrist-guard. A similar red wrist-guard was by his knees. With the second wrist-guard was a shale belt ring and a pair of gold hair ornaments, the oldest gold objects known from England.

The anatomy of the Archer has been well documented, with several unusual features including os acromiale whereby the acromion at the tip of the scapula was not fused as is usual, spina bifida occulta ('hidden' spina bifida) and a missing left patella. Research using oxygen isotope analysis in the Archer's tooth enamel has suggested that he originated from an alpine region of central Europe. An eroded hole in his jaw showed that he had suffered from an abscess, and his missing left kneecap suggests that he had an injury that left him with a painful lingering bone infection.

His skeleton is now on display at the Salisbury Museum in Salisbury.

Second burial
A male skeleton found interred nearby is believed to be that of a younger man related to the Archer, as they shared a rare hereditary anomaly, calcaneonavicular coalition, fusing of the calcaneus and of the navicular tarsal (foot bones). This younger man, sometimes called the Archer's Companion, appears to have been raised in a more local climate. The Archer was estimated to be about forty at the time of his death, while his companion was in his early twenties. The graves were discovered only a short distance from the Boscombe Bowmen, whose bones were excavated the following year.

Importance of the burials
The Archer was quickly dubbed the King of Stonehenge in the British press due to the proximity of the famous monument and some have even suggested that he could have been involved in its construction. However, this cannot be known for sure and more recently archaeologists have rejected the idea. 

His is just one high-profile burial that dates from the time of the stones' erection, but given the lavish nature of the grave his mourners clearly considered him important enough to be buried near to (if not in the immediate area of) Stonehenge. Tim Darvill regards the skeleton as possibly that of a pilgrim to Stonehenge to draw on the 'healing properties' of the bluestones.

However his grave is of particular importance because of its connections with Continental Europe and early copper smelting technology. He is believed to have been one of the earliest gold metalworkers in Britain and his discovery supports interpreters who claim that the diffusion of Beaker Culture pottery was the result of population movement, rather than just the widespread adoption of an artefact 'package'.

DNA analysis

The DNA of the Archer's skeleton was difficult to analyse at first and it had to be omitted from a 2018 study of 226 Bell Beaker burials from across Europe, although the Companion was included. Later a successful sample was taken from the Archer and analysed. It appears that both the Archer and the Companion in the male line (Y-chromosome) had Steppe ancestry, the Archer being classified as R1b1a1b1a1a (haplogroup R-L151) and the Companion as R1b1a1b1a1a2c1 (haplogroup R-L21). The two men were not related in the 1st or 2nd degree, although a more distant relationship, such as great-grandfather / great-grandson, is possible.
 
A further finding was that the Archer had a greater amount of EEF (Early European Farmer) ancestry (c. 45%) than the Companion (c. 33%). 

It had already been shown from strontium and oxygen isotope analysis of the Archer's 2nd premolar and 3rd molar teeth (which mineralise at different ages) that the Archer spent his childhood in Central Europe, probably in the Western Alps. By contrast the Companion appears to have been born in Wessex, but spent part of his childhood in Europe, perhaps in the same region of the Western Alps.

Although the Archer may have spoken an Indo-European language, it does not follow that he spoke an early form of Irish or Welsh. The authors of the 2021 study favour the view that the Celtic languages arrived in Britain with a much later influx of people from Europe which occurred in the Late Bronze Age between 1000 and 875 BC.

In popular culture
The character of Arthmael in Mark Patton's novel Undreamed Shores is based on the Archer.

See also
 Boscombe Bowmen
 Stonehenge Archer

Bibliography

References

External links
 Wessex Archaeology: The Amesbury Archer
 Salisbury Museum page on the archer
 24 Hour Museum – Amesbury Archer was an Alpine Settler Say Experts
 BBC Radio 4 programme on the Amesbury Archer

23rd-century BC people
Amesbury
Bronze Age England
History of Wiltshire
Sites associated with Stonehenge
Indo-European archaeological sites
Beaker culture